Wesley Johnson (born 2 September 1877, date of death unknown) was a Barbadian cricketer. He played in one first-class match for the Barbados cricket team in 1896/97.

See also
 List of Barbadian representative cricketers

References

External links
 

1877 births
Year of death missing
Barbadian cricketers
Barbados cricketers
People from San Fernando, Trinidad and Tobago